Babbar may refer to:Babbar movie

 Babbar (surname), including a list of people with the name
 Babbar, a tribe of Baloch people.
 Babbar Patera, a crater on Jupiter's moon Io

See also 
 Babar (disambiguation)
 Babbar Akali movement, a group of militant Sikhs in 1921 who broke away from the non-violent mainstream Akali movement
 Babbar Khalsa or Babbar Khalsa International (BKI), a Sikh organisation based in India